Rentapalla is a village in Guntur district of the Indian state of Andhra Pradesh. It is located in Sattenapalle mandal of Guntur revenue division. It is one of the villages in the mandal to be a part of Andhra Pradesh Capital Region.

Geography 
Rentapalla is located at  (16.45, 80.016667),

References 

Villages in Guntur district